Martine J. Piccart-Gebhart (born 1953) is a Belgian medical oncologist. She is a professor of oncology at the Université Libre de Bruxelles and scientific director at the Jules Bordet Institute in Brussels, Belgium. She is also a member of the Belgian Royal Academy of Medicine.

Prof. Piccart is a past president of the European CanCer Organisation. She has also held presidencies of the European Organisation for Research and Treatment of Cancer and the European Society of Medical Oncology, has served on both the American Society of Clinical Oncology and American Association for Cancer Research boards.

Biography
Martine J. Piccart-Gebhart was born in 1953.

She graduated as a medical doctor from the Université Libre de Bruxelles in 1978, where she also met her future husband, Dr. Michael Gebhart. She obtained her internal medicine certification there in 1983. After she graduated she worked as a fellow for two years with Prof. Franco Muggia at New York University Medical Center (1983–85). Returning to Brussels, she worked for Prof. J. Klastersky, head of internal medicine at the Jules Bordet Institute. She became certified in European medical oncology in London in 1989, and earned her PhD from Université Libre de Bruxelles in 1993. 

She has continued working at the Institute since then and is specialized in breast cancer and ovarian cancer.

A strong advocate for and leader of international research collaborations, Prof. Piccart, together with Prof. Aron Goldhirsch, co-founded in 1996 the Breast International Group to foster collaboration and accelerate the development of better breast cancer treatments. The organisation, which became a legal entity in 1999, is now chaired by Prof. David Cameron and unites 57 academic breast cancer research groups from around the world. About 30 clinical trials and research programmes are run or in development under its umbrella at any one time, and several of its past studies are already considered landmark and practice-changing. Prof. Piccart is currently the Immediate Past Chair, and President of BIG against breast cancer, the unit within Breast International Group dedicated entirely to raising funds to support its research.

An accomplished clinician and scientist, she is author or co-author of over 500 publications in peer-reviewed journals.

Awards and honours

 1997: European Society of Medical Oncology Award
 2004: Award from the Breast Cancer Research Foundation
 2004: Prix Mois du Cancer du Sein
 2005: Freedom to Discover grant from Bristol-Myers Squibb
 2005: Jacqueline Seroussi Memorial Foundation for Cancer Research Award
 2006: Claude Jacquillat Award for achievements in clinical oncology
 2006: ESMO-GSK Lifetime Achievement Award in Breast Cancer Research (to the BIG)
 2007: Miami Breast Cancer Conference Award of Excellence
2009: Jill Rose Award for distinguished biomedical research
2009: William L. McGuire Award
2012: Umberto Veronesi Award for the Future Fight Against Cancer
 2013: David Karnofsky Memorial Award
 2015: Komen Brinker Award for Scientific Distinction
2017: St Gallen International Breast Cancer Award Winner
2018: KNAW Bob Pinedo Cancer Care Award 
 2018: Leopold Griffuel Prize

References

External links
 Martine Piccart: medic and musician
 Martine J. Piccart-Gebhart, MD, PhD
www.BIGagainstbreastcancer.org

1953 births
Living people
Université libre de Bruxelles alumni
Belgian women physicians
Belgian oncologists
Place of birth missing (living people)
Academic staff of the Université libre de Bruxelles